The Ministry of the Russian Federation for Civil Defence, Emergency Situations and Elimination of Consequences of Natural Disasters, also known as the Ministry of Emergency Situations (abbreviated MChS) or internationally as EMERCOM (derived from "Emergency Control Ministry"), is a Russian government agency overseeing the civil emergency services in Russia.

President Boris Yeltsin established EMERCOM on January 10, 1994, though the ministry can be traced back to December 27, 1990, when the Russian Soviet Federative Socialist Republic (RSFSR) established the Russian Rescue Corps and assigned it the mission of rapid response to emergencies.

History
The history of civil defence services in Russia traces to the years of Muscovy rule and the 1649  "Direction on Municipal rescue" decree of Tsar Alexis of Russia which officially raised the Moscow Municipal Fire Service, the first active fire department in Russia. When Peter the Great was Tsar, Saint Petersburg was given its own fire department modeled on Western practices of the time. By 1863 it was transformed, by orders of Tsar Alexander II of Russia, as the first ever professional fire service in Russia and Eastern Europe.

Starting in 1932 civil defense matters were performed by the Local Air Defense Units (Местная противовоздушная оборона PBO-C, Mestnaya protivovozdushnaya oborona PVO-S) under the nascent Soviet Air Defence Forces, which were transferred to the NKVD in 1940 (and served with distinction, together with the NKVD Fire Services Command founded in 1918, in the Great Patriotic War). In 1960 it was returned to the Ministry of Defence as a service branch of the Soviet Armed Forces (the Civil Defence Forces of the Ministry of Defense) and a directly reporting agency, while the MVD retained the firefighting service.

In the aftermath of the events of the 1988 Armenian earthquake and the Chernobyl disaster, on July 17, 1990 a directive decision of the Presidium of The Supreme Council of Russian Socialist Soviet Republic led to the formation of the Russian Rescue Corps (Российский корпус спасателей), which eventually was formed by the Soviet Government on December 27, 1990. This date is marked as the official anniversary of the EMERCOM.

On April 17, 1991 the Presidium of the Supreme Council of Russia appointed Sergei Shoigu as Chairman of the State Committee for Extraordinary Situations (Государственный Комитет по чрезвычайным ситуациям, ГКЧС), which succeeded the RRC.

On November 19, 1991 the State Committee was merged with the Headquarters for Civil Defense of the USSR (under the Ministry of Defense) to create the State Committee of the Russian Federation for Civil Defence Matters, Extraordinary Situations and the Liquidation of Natural Disasters (Государственный комитет по делам гражданской обороны, чрезвычайным ситуациям и ликвидации последствий стихийных бедствий при Президенте РСФСР) and was subordinated to the President of Russia.

On January 10, 1994 the State committee became part of the Government of Russia and the ministry was named The Ministry for the Affairs of Civil Defence, Emergency Situations and Disaster Relief, with Sergei Shoigu as a minister.

On January 1, 2002, The Russian State Fire Service, the national fire service, became part of the ministry with 278,000 firefighters, removed from Ministry of Internal Affairs control after 84 years.

On May 12, 2012, Vladimir Puchkov was appointed as the new minister, replacing Shoigu who was later appointed as Defense Minister after a brief stint as Governor of Moscow Oblast.

On July 1, 2016, an EMERCOM firefighting Il-76 crashed after taking off from Irkutsk International airport while on its way to dump water as to help douse wildfires in Siberia.

Duties
According to an EMERCOM publication, the Ministry is an agency of federal executive power with the following tasks:
 developing proposals and initiatives in the sphere of State policy on issues within the Ministry's competence;
 managing the civil defence and search and rescue Service in the Russian Federation;
 providing for the functioning and further development of the Russian System of Disaster Management (RSDM);
 directing activities aimed at eliminating the consequences of large-scale disasters, catastrophes and other emergencies;
 conducting special submarine activities;
 supervising the use of finance resources allocated to the Government for disaster management and response;
 organizing the training of the population, and governing agencies and the RSDM forces for disaster management and response;
 and organizing international cooperation in the fields of the Ministry's competency.

Ministers

Sergei Shoigu 

The first Minister in charge of EMERCOM was Sergei Shoigu. He was appointed by President Yeltsin in November 1991 as Chairman of the State Committee of the Russian Federation for Civil Defence Matters, Extraordinary Situations and the Liquidation of Natural Disasters. Shoigu was given the rank of Major General in October 1994, and his committee became a ministry in January 1994. President Yeltsin showed his faith in the importance of EMERCOM by designating Minister Shoigu a member of the Russian Security Council by Presidential Decree on February 1, 1994. In May 2012 he was appointed as Governor of Moscow Oblast and he resigned from his office.

Vladimir Puchkov
Vladimir Puchkov was the Deputy Minister of Emergencies. In May 2012 he was appointed as Minister first government of Dmitry Medvedev. Six years later, when the new government was formed, he did not join the government.

Yevgeny Zinichev

Yevgeny Zinichev was appointed minister on May 18, 2018, in the second Medvedev government. Zinichev was not a career lifeguard and had served all his life in security agencies such as the KGB, the FSO and the FSB. Prior to appointment, Zinichev held the position of deputy director of the FSB. After the resignation of the Medvedev government in 2020, he retained his post in the new government of Mikhail Mishustin.

Yevgeny Zinichev tragically died on 8 September 2021, aged 55, during the filming of an interdepartmental exercise to protect the Arctic zone of Russia. According to the ministry, he fell off a cliff while trying to save the life of director and cameraman Aleksandr Melnik, who also died. His death was the first case in the history of post-Soviet Russia of the death of an incumbent federal minister.

Aleksandr Kurenkov
Aleksandr Kurenkov was appointed minister on 25 May 2022.

Departments
 Department for the Protection of the Population and Territories
 Department for Disaster Prevention
 Department of Forces
 Department for International Cooperation
 Department for the Elimination of Consequences of Radiological and other Disasters
 Department for Science and Technology
 Management Department

Commissions and Boards

 Interagency Commission of the Russian Federation for Fighting Forest Fires
 Interagency Commission of the Russian Federation for Floods
 Interagency Maritime Coordinating Commission for Emergencies on the Seas and Water Basins
 Interagency Commission of the Russian Federation for the Certification of Rescuers

Working through the office of the Prime Minister, the Ministry can ask for private, Ministry of Defence or National Guard of Russia assistance. That is, the Ministry has international coordination power and the ability to tap local resources if required.

The Department of International Cooperation, to present an example of the activities of one of these departments and commissions, has already signed agreements on cooperation during disaster response and prevention with Germany, Italy, France, Switzerland, Poland, Belarus, Georgia, and Kazakhstan. Mutual assistance pacts are ready for signing with Mongolia, Latvia, Finland, Armenia, Moldova, Serbia and Estonia. An agreement also exists with the U.N. High Commission for Refugees (UNHCR), and agreements are sought with the OSCE and NATO.

Internal organizations
 Regional Centres – EMERCOM centres are located in Moscow, St. Petersburg, Nizhny Novgorod, Rostov-on-Don, Samara, Yekaterinburg, Novosibirsk, Krasnoyarsk, Chita and Khabarovsk.
 Civil Defence and Emergency Headquarters – Many regions, provinces, autonomous administrative units, districts and towns possess these headquarters.
 Command and Control Center – These centers are located in Moscow, and in each region and oblast.
 Training and Education Facilities – These include the Civil Defense Academy, Training and Methodology centres, an All-Russia Scientific Research Institute, an All-Russian Monitoring and Laboratory Control Centre, and a Centre for Scientific Analysis of Civil Defence Issues.

To perform rapid response operations the following forces and equipment are available:
 Russian State Fire Service – The highest fire service body in Russia.
 Central Air-Mobile Rescue Team – These teams are equipped with aviation facilities that include helicopters and cargo aircraft (Ilyushin Il-76, Antonov An-72, An-148-100EM, Ka-32A11VS). The teams have taken part in United Nations' humanitarian delivery operations.
 Civil Defense Forces Command – These troops consist of military troop divisions and regiments/brigades stationed in various regions of the country aimed at civil defense measures during natural and man-made disasters.
 EMERCOM Civil Defense Academy – trains all officers and non-commissioned personnel of the Ministry in the duties of civil defense.
 Search and Rescue Service – This service maintains 30 units in various republics, regions and provinces.

Ranks

Equipment

Aviation

Cars

Boats

Gallery

See also

 Ramenskoye Airport, airbase, used by EMERCOM
 Awards of the Ministry for Emergency Situations of Russia

References

 EMERCOM of Russia, publication of the Ministry of Emergency Situations
 "EMERCOM: RUSSIA'S EMERGENCY RESPONSE TEAM" (1995), Mr. Timothy L. Thomas, Foreign Military Studies Office, Fort Leavenworth, Kansas. Low Intensity Conflict and Law Enforcement, Vol 4, Autumn 1995, No 2

External links
 
 

Ministry of Emergency Situations (Russia)
Emergency Situations, Ministry of
Humanitarian military operations